Jee-Young Lee (born 2 December 1985) is a South Korean professional golfer now playing on the United States LPGA Tour.

Born in Seoul, South Korea, Lee began playing golf at age 14 and turned professional in 2004, playing on the LPGA of Korea Tour. In 2005, as a member of the KLPGA, she won the CJ Nine Bridges Classic, while still not yet a member of the LPGA. That same year, she won the TaeYoung Cup on the KLPGA Tour.

Professional wins (2)

LPGA Tour (1)

LPGA Tour playoff record (0–1)

LPGA of Korea Tour (1)
2005 (1) Taeyoung Cup Korea Women's Open

Results in LPGA majors
Results not in chronological order before 2015.

^ The Evian Championship was added as a major in 2013.

CUT = missed the half-way cut
WD = withdrew
"T" = tied

Summary

Most consecutive cuts made – 14 (2006 Kraft Nabisco – 2009 LPGA)
Longest streak of top-10s – 3 (2007 LPGA - 2007 British Open)

LPGA Tour career summary

Official as of the 2015 season

Team appearances
Professional
Lexus Cup (representing Asia team): 2006 (winners), 2007 (winners)

External links

South Korean female golfers
LPGA Tour golfers
LPGA of Korea Tour golfers
Golfers from Seoul
1985 births
Living people